Graz is a city in Austria.

Graz may also refer to:

In education:
Graz School, psychological school
Graz University of Technology, the second largest university in Styria, Austria
University of Graz, university located in Graz, Austria

In other fields:
Graz Airport, airport in Austria
Graz Entertainment, a North American licensing company

See also
Graz'zt, sinister demon lord in the Dungeons & Dragons role-playing game
Simmering-Graz-Pauker, one of the most important Austrian industrial conglomerates
SK Sturm Graz, Austrian football club
University of Graz Library, the largest scientific and public library in Styria and the largest library in Austria outside Vienna